Tarbiẕ was a scientific quarterly of contemporary Jewish studies, Humanities and religion, published in Hebrew, by the Institute of Jewish Studies (now Mandel Institute for Jewish Studies) at the Hebrew University of Jerusalem. The journal was first published in the Autumn of 1929 and ended its publication in 2017. Among Hebrew journals, it is considered one of the most important journals in its field. Etymologically, the word "Tarbiz" means "place of dissemination of learning," particularly that related to an "academy," or "seat of learning."

Tarbiẕ deals with the Jewish sciences: Judaism, Biblical criticism, Talmud, Kabbalah, Israeli customs, Jewish history, Hebrew bibliography, and more.

History
In the year 1935, to mark the eight-hundredth anniversary of Maimonides' birth, the periodical became solely devoted to the subject of Maimonides, initially called: The Book of Maimonides of the Tarbiz. It later broadened its scope to include the entire range of Jewish studies.

The first editor of the journal was Professor Yaakov Nahum Epstein who served as its chief-editor until 1952, after whom, Hayyim Schirmann took-over from 1955 to 1969, followed by Ephraim Elimelech Urbach between the years 1971–1981. The following years saw a range of other chief editors. Participating in its writing were renowned personalities in the field of Jewish studies, including those who regularly wrote about it, such as Gershom Scholem, Saul Lieberman, Simcha Assaf, Hanoch Albeck, among others. Many of the key articles were also printed separately, or collected by their authors to be assembled into book-form.

The current publisher is the Magnes Publishing House at the Hebrew University. The journal's citation and reference rules were adopted by law journals published by Israeli universities whenever citing sources touching upon traditional Jewish law.

Abstracting and indexing
The journal is abstracted and indexed in the Academic Search Premier, IBZ Online, Periodicals Index Online, Jewish Studies Source, Linguistic Bibliography, Old Testament Abstracts Online, and MLA - Modern Language Association Database.

References

External links
 Tarbiz - A Quarterly for Jewish Studies (JSTOR back issues)

Judaic studies journals
Quarterly journals
Publications established in 1929
Hebrew-language journals
Publications disestablished in 2017
Religion history journals